Epia picta is a moth in the family Bombycidae. It is found in Colombia.

References

Natural History Museum Lepidoptera generic names catalog

Bombycidae
Moths described in 1920